Nayakan is a 1987 Indian Tamil-language epic crime drama written and directed by Mani Ratnam. Produced by Muktha Srinivasan, the film stars Kamal Haasan, Saranya (in her feature debut) and Karthika, with Janagaraj, Vijayan, M. V. Vasudeva Rao, Delhi Ganesh, Nizhalgal Ravi, Nassar and Tara in supporting roles. It revolves around the transformation of an ordinary slum dweller named Velu into a feared don through various stages of his life.

Nayakan is loosely based on the life of the Bombay underworld don Varadarajan Mudaliar and the American film The Godfather (1972). Ratnam was initially approached to remake the Hindi film Pagla Kahin Ka (1970) for Srinivasan and Haasan, but refused. He instead suggested two other stories, one of which impressed Haasan and became Nayakan. Cinematography was handled by P. C. Sreeram, and editing by B. Lenin and V. T. Vijayan. Filming began in late 1986, taking place primarily in Madras and to a lesser extent, Bombay.

Nayakan was released on 21 October 1987, Diwali day. It became a critical and commercial success, running for over 175 days in theatres. Haasan's performance earned him the National Film Award for Best Actor. The film also earned the National Awards for Best Cinematography (Sreeram) and Best Art Direction (Thota Tharani). The film was India's official submission for the Academy Award for Best Foreign Language Film in 1988 at the 60th Academy Awards; however, it was not shortlisted among the final nominees. It was included in TIME "All-Time 100 Best Films", and News18's "100 greatest Indian films of all time". The film was remade in Hindi as Dayavan (1988).

Plot 
An anti-government union leader's son Sakthivel "Velu" is arrested by the police to find his whereabouts. They trick Velu into believing them as his well-wishers and release him. When Velu meets his father, the police kill the latter. Feeling betrayed, Sakthivel stabs the police inspector and runs away to Bombay, where he is raised by Hussain, a kind-hearted smuggler living in the Dharavi slums. One day, when Hussain is ill, A young Velu, decides to carry out the smuggling activity on behalf of Hussain. His demand for a bigger commission from the smugglers enrages them, and they involve Inspector Kelkar to arrest Hussain and kill him in jail. When they close the case as suicide, Velu is enraged knowing the truth and murders Kelkar. He later takes care of Kelkar's family which consists of his wife and a mentally challenged son Ajit. Kelkar's wife knew that her husband's immorality resulted in his death.

Velu meets Neela, a schoolgirl forced into prostitution, who has interests to pursue her education. Her innocence and courage impress Velu, and he eventually marries her. They have two children: Surya and Charumathi. Velu's power and command gradually increases in Dharavi as he voices out in support of local people which gains him huge popularity among the masses. His rival smugglers try to murder Velu in an attack, but Neela is killed instead. After avenging Neela's death, Velu sends his children to Madras to safeguard them.

Years pass by, Velu's power further increases in Bombay and is fondly called Velu Naicker by everyone. Surya and Charumathi return to Bombay as adults after education. Surya follows Velu's footsteps, a fact that he is initially hesitant of, and later learns to accept. But when Surya is killed trying to flee the police in a botched mission, Charumathi blames Velu for the deaths of Neela and Surya. She decides to leave Bombay citing that she wants to get away from her father and his violent ways. Charumathi disowns her father and leaves his home. A new ACP, Patil is deputed in Bombay to eliminate gangsters; his first target is Velu. He collects all the evidence needed for the arrest of Velu. When Velu comes to meet Patil, he learns that Charumathi is married to him and they have a son. Patil too learns that his wife is Velu's daughter and suspects that she might help her father to flee from the police.

Velu absconds and his allies are arrested. He decides to surrender to the police to save them from undergoing torture in the police station. Through Charumathi, Velu sets up his surrender. Patil is shocked due to the lack of proper evidence against Velu as none comes forward from the public as a witness against the crimes committed by him. Patil meets Kelkar's widow and the now grown-up Ajit and requests to disclose the truth behind her husband's death in the court. She refuses and defends Velu's acts. But Ajit is shocked after learning the truth. Velu is produced in the court and is exonerated due to lack of valid and strong evidence. He is overcome with emotion when he meets his young grandson (Charumathi's son) Shaktivel. Velu steps out of the court amid a big cheer from his supporters, until Ajit shoots him to avenge his father's death; Velu dies on the spot.

Cast 

 
Kamal Haasan as "Velu" Naicker
Saranya as Neela
Karthika as Charumati
Janagaraj as Selvam
Vijayan as Durai
M. V. Vasudeva Rao as Hussain Bhai
Delhi Ganesh as Iyer
Nizhalgal Ravi as Surya
Nassar as ACP Patil
Tara as Shakila
Kuyili (special appearance in "Nila Adhu Vanathumele")
R. N. Sudarshan, R. N. K. Prasad and R. N. Jayagopal as the Reddy brothers
Pradeep Shakthi as Inspector Kelkar
Raja Krishnamurthy as Rathnavel Naicker, Velu's father
Tinnu Anand as Ajit Kelkar
Aditya V. Modi as Sakthivel

Production

Development 

In the mid 1980s, Muktha Srinivasan narrated a story inspired by the American film The Godfather (1972) to Sivaji Ganesan who agreed to act in the film. Amala and Kamal Haasan were also confirmed to act. However Ananthu, then an associate of Haasan, felt that it would be a Ganesan-focused film and not a Haasan film. The project was dropped. Haasan later told Srinivasan about the-then upcoming director Mani Ratnam. Ratnam had previously wanted to cast Haasan as the protagonist in his directorial debut, Pallavi Anu Pallavi (1983), but the collaboration could not materialise then as Haasan was committed to Raja Paarvai (1981) at that time.

Srinivasan came to Ratnam's house and gave him an envelope, which contained a cassette of the Hindi film Pagla Kahin Ka (1970). Ratnam, after watching the film, met Haasan and rejected the offer to remake the film. After Haasan asked him the kind of film he preferred to make, Ratnam suggested two stories: one was in the action genre similar to Dirty Harry (1971) and Beverly Hills Cop (1984), while the other was based on the life of the Bombay underworld don Varadarajan Mudaliar; the latter was finalised. Ratnam had earlier narrated this story, when it was only an idea, to producer R. C. Prakash, but it was not picked up then. Cinematography for Nayakan was handled by P. C. Sreeram, and editing by B. Lenin and V. T. Vijayan.

Casting 
In September 1986, Haasan gave his schedule dates for the film to Srinivasan, and was paid 1.75 million (US$145,583 in 1987) for playing Velu. Ratnam wanted Haasan to have as realistic a look as possible. He preferred Haasan in traditional Hindu attire. Haasan was initially hesitant regarding his look and wanted to sport a beard similar to that of his old-aged look in Sagara Sangamam (1983), as he felt it would not give away his jaw line, which would reveal that the character was portrayed by a younger person. Ratnam, in turn, did not want Haasan to sport a look similar to Sagara Sangamam or any of his other previous films. Haasan ultimately sported dentures to provide some weight around his jaw for Velu's old-age look.

Neela, the wife of Velu, was played by Saranya, who made her debut in the film. The character was created by Srinivasan to reduce the violent content and help the film cater to family audiences. Ratnam wanted a "new face" to portray Neela as he felt only then the character would have the required zest and gusto. Saranya sent her photograph to Ratnam to audition for the role. She was later cast after a successful screen test. Saranya's father was against her being cast, but she and her mother managed to convince him. Though Ratnam has stated that Saranya was "the first and only person we saw for the role", Debashree Roy claimed that she was approached, but refused as she considered that speaking in Tamil would be difficult for her.

According to Suhasini, Ratnam considered her for the role of Velu's daughter Charumati; however, the role ultimately went to Karthika. Ratnam believes that Nassar was suggested to him by Haasan, when Raghuvaran was being considered for the role of the assistant commissioner Patil. Nassar shot for six days and initially believed there was nothing special in his role. He later admitted his surprise of the reach of his character post-release. Although Tara was then known mainly for playing leading roles, she accepted the supporting role of Velu's sister Shakila. She later recalled, "I didn't know what to accept and what to reject. I just grabbed whatever was offered irrespective of the character. That was a mistake." Raja Krishnamoorthy (later known as Kitty), then the General Manager at Enfield India, quit to portray Velu's father, with Nayakan being his debut film. Haasan wanted Tinnu Anand for the role of Ajit, the son of Inspector Kelkar (Pradeep Shakthi). Anand was reluctant since he wanted to focus on his career as a director, but after Haasan insisted, Anand accepted.

Filming 
Ratnam initially planned to complete the shooting in 60 days and 70 rolls of film. The initial budget was 6 million (US$500,000 in 1987), but time and cost overruns increased the budget to beyond 10 million (US$830,000 in 1987). According to Srinivasan, principal photography commenced in November 1986 and the first schedule lasted for 10 days, but the scenes shot during this period were scrapped because Haasan disliked them, prompting script rewrites and causing shooting to be delayed; the rewritten script had more violence, and scenes taken from The Godfather and Once Upon a Time in America (1984). According to Ratnam, a three-day test shoot involving Haasan, unknown to Srinivasan, was done in December 1986 as the script was not yet complete. While the shots taken did not make the final cut, they helped to get the technical aspects of the film on the right track.

Ratnam said the first "real schedule" of Nayakan began in January 1987. 15 days of shooting took place in the slum areas of Dharavi. Using photographs taken there, the art director Thota Tharani created a set at Venus Studios in Madras. Thousands of junior artists were hired to recreate the atmosphere of the slum areas. Additionally, pigeons were brought for the same. Haasan helped in the make-up for the other actors in the film and asked Janagaraj and Delhi Ganesh to cut their hair so as to make their characters Selvam and Iyer in their old age scenes look convincing. One scene involved Velu telling Iyer, "Udamba paathukonga" and Ganesh spontaneously said "Naa poraen. Naa irundhu enna panna poraen. Nee nalla irukkanum, Naickerae"; an impressed Haasan told Ratnam to retain the improvised dialogue. Haasan used Ittar perfume for the female cast.

Ratnam had marked around 1.2 million (US$100,000 in 1987) for the film's action sequences. To make the sequences slick and entertaining, cinematographer and stunt sequence director Jim Allen, who was known for his work stunt sequences in Sholay (1975) was chosen. But after three days, he was removed from the film as he charged 200,000 per day (US$16,000 in 1987) and Srinivasan could not afford the money. Haasan brought his own gun, sparing Ratnam the usage of a prop. In the scene where Haasan chases Kelkar, he uses his own bottle of sugar glass, which he had brought from the United States. The remaining portions were shot at Bombay (now Mumbai), including the portions involving Velu's childhood life in the city. The scene featuring Neela studying for her mathematics examination was suggested by Srinivasan. Velu's childhood portions before he moves to Bombay were canned in Old Mahabalipuram Road for one and a half days. This was also the last part of the principal photography.

The song "Naan Sirithal Deepavali" was shot at the spot where the Taj Club House is located today. The old building previously located at that spot was called the "Indian Express Building" by film industrialists as it was adjacent to the Old office of Indian Express. Thota Tharani converted the building's exterior into a brothel and used the opposite end of the building for Velu's house location. Nayakan was notable for using frame-within-the-frame technique of filmmaking. Ratnam and Haasan met Mudaliar in person, when Ratnam asked Mudaliar how he would foresee his own death; according to Haasan, Mudaliar replied that he would "either die peacefully in a hospital (which is what happened) but left to the police, who couldn't prove anything against him, they would bring him out of court and someone would slap him. This would cause a riot and they would then shoot him", which inspired the film's climax.

Post-production 
When the film was completed and the first print was ready, it was three hours long. Although Ratnam and Haasan wanted Srinivasan to release the film uncut, he felt audiences would never see the entire film due to its length, so he requested Lenin to remove the scenes which he felt were unnecessary. The result, according to Srinivasan, "gave life to the movie, along with the theme music Thenpandi seemayilae."

Themes 
Haasan, Ratnam and Srinivasan have acknowledged to Nayakan being inspired by The Godfather in various scenes. These include Velu's killing of the Reddy brothers, the murder of Velu's son Surya, and Velu crying at Surya's corpse. One scene in the film involves Velu and Selvam tying their illicit cargo to large bags of salt attached to rubber inner tubes which they then dump into the sea; the cargo sinks from the weight of the salt, but when the salt dissolves the cargo bobs to the surface, by which time they have passed the customs officers. This was described by Lalitha Gopalan in her 2002 book Cinema of Interruptions as an homage to Once Upon a Time in America, a view that was shared by S. Shiva Kumar of The Hindu.

According to historian S. Theodore Baskaran, the film "tends to glorify violence and portrays the anti-social, smuggler-king in an approving and sympathetic way, modelling him on Robin Hood." Lalitha Gopalan notes that the film "attempts faithfully to re-create a historical period by carefully managing different aspects of the mise en scène. More than any other detail in the mise en scène, automobiles – different models of cars, jeeps, and vans – indicate the passage of time within the diegesis." According to a New Straits Times article, the film does not extol crime or violence; rather it narrates the story of a tragic character who rises from slums to untold riches and unbridled power. Ratnam has stated that the question asked by Velu's grandson, whether he is good or bad, "puts across the moral dilemma of the man in a nutshell".

Music 
The soundtrack was composed by Ilaiyaraaja, this being his 400th film soundtrack. Pulamaipithan wrote the lyrics for all the songs except "Nila Adhu Vanathumele", which Ilaiyaraaja himself wrote. The song "Andhi Mazhai Megam" is set in the Carnatic raga Natabhairavi, "Nee Oru Kaadhal Sangeetham" is in the Hindustani raga Desh, and "Nila Adhu Vanathumele" is in the Carnatic Keeravani.

The theme song "Thenpandi Cheemayile" plays for most of the film; during the introduction titles, it has the colloquial line "yaar adichaaro" (sung by Ilaiyaraaja), but when it plays later in the film, the line is altered to the more polished "yaar adithaaro" (sung by Haasan). Film critic Baradwaj Rangan asked Ratnam whether this change was an indication to the eventual refinement of Velu. Ratnam said that Ilaiyaraaja's portions were recorded first, and that when they went for recording, they had this rustic version which lacked background music, and was of folk quality. Because the song was going to be repeated throughout the film, they also wanted a more orchestral version, and in this version sung by Haasan, the language became more sophisticated. "Nee Oru Kaadhal Sangeetham" is featured on both sides of the original LP record as the second track. Though Ratnam liked the original tune Ilaiyaraaja created for "Thenpandi Cheemayile", he felt it did not suit the song's narrative; the original tune was then used for "Nila Adhu Vanathumele".

Release 

Nayakan was released on 21 October 1987, Diwali day. The Censor Board at Madras initially refused to permit the release of the film, as it was based on a living person. When Srinivasan appealed to the revising committee at Bombay, they said that they would permit the release of the film he produced a letter stating that it was not based on Mudaliar's life. Through writer Mathioli Shanmugam, Srinivasan met Mudaliar, who gave him a letter, after which the censor appellate board at Bombay permitted the release of the film. G. Venkateswaran of GV Films bought the rights of the film after Srinivasan distributed the film; Venkateswaran also received a producer's credit. It was dubbed into Telugu as Nayakudu and into Hindi as Velu Nayakan. Despite the Hindi dub, it was later remade in Hindi as Dayavan (1988). In 2015, Nayakan was screened at the Habitat Film Festival.

Box office 
Nayakan became a major success in many states. The film completed 214 days run in Tamil Nadu and completed 100 days in both Andhra Pradesh and Karnataka. The film ran for 25 weeks at Madras' Anand Theatre, 105 days at Grelan, 105 days at Udhayam, 175 days at Madurai Minipriya, 100 days at Salem, 85 days at Trichy's Kalaiyarangam, 100 days at Jupiter, 105 days at Coimbatore's Archana, 100 days at Bombay's Dinora and 224 at Bangalore's Pallavi. The Telugu dubbed version Nayakadu also completed 100 days of theatrical run.

Critical reception 
Nayakan received critical acclaim. On 23 October 1987, N. Krishnaswamy of The Indian Express said, "[Nayakan] is a rare Tamil film. Sensitivity is its hallmark. Authenticity is its lifebreath. It has the stamp of nativity. It has class. Yet, it is not an Art film. It could be a watershed in Tamil cinema; an artistically made film that could make money as well." On 1 November, Ananda Vikatan stated that Haasan underplayed his role well and demonstrated his histrionics as a godfather in the film well, adding that the film stood out for its sets, taking, colour, richness and international quality camera work. The magazine gave the film one of its highest marks of 60. Jayamanmadhan of Kalki lauded the film, saying it could be watched more than once. A 1988 review published in Bombay: The City Magazine described Haasan as having given a "powerhouse performance". Writing for India Today in 1989, Madhu Jain believed Nayakan deserved "a permanent place in the Indian cinema pantheon" after watching it at the 12th International Film Festival in Delhi.

Accolades 

The film was India's official submission for the Academy Award for Best Foreign Language Film in 1988 at the 60th Academy Awards; however, it was not shortlisted among the final nominees.

Legacy 
Nayakan became a "landmark" of popular Indian cinema. As a part of its legacy, the film has been acclaimed for being a box-office success whilst being a critical success. English journalist Phil Hardy stated in his 1997 book The BFI Companion to Crime, "From the films that followed in the wake of The Godfather, the most interesting is Mani Rathnam's Nayakan (1987) starring [Kamal Haasan] in a fictional version of the Bombay gangster Varadarajan Mudaliar's life." In 2005, the magazine TIME included Nayakan in its list of "All-Time 100 Best Films". After the film was selected by TIME as one of the best, insiders of the magazine spoke about Ratnam's work in the film, saying "Ratnam has no such difficulty blending melodrama and music, violence and comedy, realism and delirium, into a two-and-a-half-hour demonstration that, when a gangster's miseries are mounting, the most natural solution is to sing in the rain." The tagline given to the film by TIME was "A terrific gangster epic in the Godfather style."

The film was also ranked 82nd in The Moving Arts Film Journal list of greatest films of all time. Nayakan was also included in NDTV's list "India's 20 greatest films" at no 13. In April 2013, on the centenary of Indian cinema, News18 included the film in its list of "100 greatest Indian films of all time".  When questioned by Baradwaj Rangan if he would make a sequel to Nayakan, Ratnam said, "Never. When you finish a film, you're glad to be rid of it. You're happy you don't have to go back to that script again. Been there, done that."

In popular culture 
The scenes and dialogues from the film have been parodied in various films, including Dumm Dumm Dumm (2001), and Chellamae (2004). When stand-up comedian and television anchor Bosskey launched a quirky play titled Dada in October 2005, he named the cast after famous characters in Tamil films. Accordingly, Anniyan (one of Vikram's character in the film), Badshah (Rajinikanth in Baashha) and Velu Naicker (Haasan's role in Nayakan) play the central characters of a family of brothers. Similarly, in the 2013 comedy film Onbadhule Guru, in which the characters were named after popular protagonists of Tamil cinema, a member of the supporting cast was christened Velu Naicker. According to the Telugu newspaper Eenadu, Rajinikanth, after being impressed with Nayakan, requested Ratnam to write a similar script, but the project never materialised; its similarities with Pa. Ranjith's script for Kabali (2016) made him accept to star in the latter film. The famous line in the film, "Neenga Nallavara Kettavara?" (Are you good or bad?) was used in "The Punch Song", a song from the film, Aaha Kalyanam (2014).

Delhi Ganesh reprises his role as Iyer, in the gangster-drama, Vendhu Thanindhathu Kaadu.

Controversy 
In October 2012, coinciding with the 25th anniversary of Nayakan, Haasan published an article in The Hindu, titled "Of course Velu Nayakan doesn't dance", in which he recounted the making of the film. In the article, he described Srinivasan as stingy and unhappy about shooting the film in Bombay, adding that films "were a business" for him and he "wasn't interested in films as art". In response, Srinivasan accused Haasan of defaming him, and wrote an article titled "Living in past glory", his rejoinder to Haasan's article, in which he accused Haasan of "distorting the facts" and "undermining the contributions made by everyone." He also accused Haasan of interfering with the original screenplay by Ratnam to include sequences copied from The Godfather and Once Upon a Time in America. Srinivasan, however, concluded by writing that he was not against Haasan taking credit for the film's success, as long as it was not at his expense.

See also 
 List of submissions to the 60th Academy Awards for Best Foreign Language Film
List of Indian submissions for the Academy Award for Best International Feature Film

Notes

References

Bibliography

External links 

1980s Tamil-language films
1987 crime films
1987 films
Fictional portrayals of the Maharashtra Police
Films about organised crime in India
Films directed by Mani Ratnam
Films featuring a Best Actor National Award-winning performance
Films scored by Ilaiyaraaja
Films set in Chennai
Films set in Mumbai
Films shot in Mumbai
Films whose cinematographer won the Best Cinematography National Film Award
Films whose production designer won the Best Production Design National Film Award
Indian crime films
Indian films based on actual events
Indian gangster films
Tamil films remade in other languages